Rick Walters (born July 19, 1971) was an award-winning and Grey Cup champion slotback in the Canadian Football League.

Born in Mandeville, Jamaica, Walters moved with his family to Toronto, Ontario at age 7, and then on to Edmonton, Alberta. A graduate of Simon Fraser University, he joined the Saskatchewan Roughriders in 1994. In 1999 he joined his hometown Edmonton Eskimos for a 5-year stint, becoming a Grey Cup champ in 2003. In 2001 he won the prestigious Tom Pate Memorial Award for outstanding community service. He finished his career with a brief stay with the Calgary Stampeders, having caught 221 passes for 2629 yards, scoring 12 touchdowns, and rushing for another 187 yards. He has since become coach of the Edmonton Huskies junior football team.

He is a volunteer with Kids Kottage and Kids with Cancer Society. Presently he works with the Government of Alberta as a Manager of Special Projects including working on the 2009 Grey Cup in Calgary, the 2010 Winter Olympics in Vancouver and the 2010 Grey Cup in Edmonton. He lives in St. Albert with his wife Jana and their three children Halle, Raea and Bella.

References

1971 births
Living people
Calgary Stampeders players
Edmonton Elks players
Jamaican players of Canadian football
Saskatchewan Roughriders players
Simon Fraser Clan football players
Simon Fraser University alumni
Canadian football people from Edmonton
Canadian football people from Toronto
People from Mandeville, Jamaica
Black Canadian players of Canadian football
Jamaican emigrants to Canada